The Besnard Lakes Are the Roaring Night is the third studio album by the Canadian rock band The Besnard Lakes, released in North America on March 9, 2010. The lead single, "Albatross", was released as a 12-inch single on February 9, 2010.

The band describe the album as "psychedelic rock- each song is its own little world, an atmosphere. I’ve always been enamored with these songs that take forever to get going, long songs that build, with a story and a long build to a climax." Thematically, the album continues their lyrical style of combining fictional and true stories. Main songwriters Jace Lasek and Olga Goreas have different thematical approaches to their songwriting on the album. Lasek's songs usually revolve around a retired spy who worked during the war and is now a lousy musician, while Goreas' songs are more inspired by her personal experiences.

The album was tracked and recorded at the band's own studio, Breakglass Studio, using a 1968 Neve germanium mixing console rumoured to have been used to record portions of Led Zeppelin's Physical Graffiti, and introduces some new instrumentation for the band: 12 string guitar, flute, omnichord, and mellotron.

The album was a shortlisted nominee for the 2010 Polaris Music Prize.

Track listing

References

2010 albums
The Besnard Lakes albums
Outside Music albums